The Fiat Downtown is a concept car originally shown in 1993 at the Turin Motor Show by the Italian car company Fiat. It was designed by Roberto Giolito. From 1991 to 1993, 2 examples were made in total, first by Stola and second by Fiat from ready molds.

The Downtown is a plastic bodied car on an aluminium chassis, resulting in a low kerb weight of 700kg. It is  powered by a 9.5hp motor integrated in each rear wheel, with rear-mounted sodium-sulphur batteries that can achieve a claimed top speed of 62mph, or a range of 186 miles at 30mph.

References

Electric concept cars
Downtown